Jeffrey Lyndon Orridge (born 1960) is  the chief executive officer of TVOntario, the provincial educational television network. He was appointed effective November 30, 2020. Previously he served as 13th Commissioner of the Canadian Football League (CFL) and was the first African-American chief executive of a major North American sports league. Earlier in his career, Orridge served as COO of Right to Play and executive director of CBC Sports Properties.

Early life and education
Orridge is a New York native. His mother was a registered nurse and social worker and his father worked for the New York City Transit Authority. Orridge participated in track and field and played basketball in school until he tore his ACL. He graduated from the Collegiate School (New York City). He earned a psychology degree from Amherst College in 1982, and graduated from Harvard Law School in 1986.

Career
After graduating from law school, Orridge joined the corporate law firm Rogers & Wells before becoming executive director of Home Attendant Corp. at North General Hospital. In 1991, he became head of business and legal affairs at USA Basketball, the governing body for the Olympic sport. He was the organization's first in-house attorney. He left the organization in 1994 and joined Reebok International. In the mid to late 1990s, he became global sports marketing director for Reebok International, and was sports licensing director for Warner Bros. Consumer Products. He also served as senior vice president and general manager for Momentum Worldwide and in the early 2000s, and as chief marketing officer for OneNetNow, and has served as vice-president of worldwide licensing and entertainment and new business development for Mattel Inc.

In 2007, he was named chief operating officer at Right to Play in Canada, an organization that focused on the use of sports and play for development with children in disadvantaged countries, until 2011. In April 2011, Orridge became executive director of CBC Sports Properties. Orridge also served as general manager for the Olympics on CBC.

In March 2015, Orridge became the first African-American chief executive of a major North American sports league when he became the 13th commissioner of the Canadian Football League (CFL). In April 2017, it was announced that due to philosophical differences between Orridge and the board of governors over the future of the CFL, Orridge would step down from his position as commissioner of the CFL, effective June 30, 2017. His final day as CFL commissioner was June 15, 2017, with Jim Lawson taking over the Commissioner role on an interim basis. He was succeeded by Randy Ambrosie as commissioner on July 5, 2017.

Controversy
In 2016, Orridge received media attention after saying there was no conclusive link between playing in the CFL and developing Chronic traumatic encephalopathy (CTE), a progressive degenerative disease of the brain found in athletes (and others) with a history of repetitive brain trauma. At the time, there was a $200 million class-action lawsuit in Canada's courts on behalf of CFL players seeking monetary compensation for CTE. A document released by the British Journal of Sport Medicine in April 2017 discussing treatment of concussions stated: "There's still no scientific evidence of a cause-and-effect relationship between concussions and degenerative problems."

References

1960 births
American emigrants to Canada
American lawyers
Canadian Football League commissioners
Canadian people of African-American descent
Canadian television executives
Harvard Law School alumni
Living people
People from New York City
Place of birth missing (living people)
American chief operating officers
Amherst College alumni
TVO executives